Simple Fix is the debut full-length album by alternative rock group Swell Daze. The record was released on July 1, 2014. It was recorded in Cue Recording Studios in Falls Church, Virginia and Bias Recording Studios in Springfield, Virginia.

Personnel
Addison Smith - electric and acoustic guitars, backing vocals, papoose 
McCoy Douglasson - lead and backing vocals
Titus Barton - drums, percussion, backing vocals
Mitch Weissman - bass guitar, piano, keyboards
Jim Ebert - Producer, organ, moog
Sean Russell - Sound engineer
Vlado Meller - Mastering Engineer

Track listing

References

External links
Swell Daze on Reverb Nation

2014 albums